Jersey Shore Roller Derby (JSRD) is a women's flat-track roller derby league based in Toms River, New Jersey. Founded in 2007, it has three intra-league home teams and two travel teams which compete against teams from other leagues. Jersey Shore is a member of the Women's Flat Track Derby Association (WFTDA).

History
Founded after five local women saw the 2006 Rollergirls reality show, by 2009, the league had more than sixty skaters. Each of the league's bouts also raises funds and awareness for a charity.

Jersey Shore was accepted into the Women's Flat Track Derby Association Apprentice Program in October 2010, and became a full member of the WFTDA in September 2011.

Rankings

References

Women's Flat Track Derby Association Division 3
Roller derby leagues established in 2007
Roller derby leagues in New Jersey
Toms River, New Jersey
2007 establishments in New Jersey